Mercapturic acid is a condensation product formed from the coupling of cysteine with aromatic compounds. It is formed as a conjugate in the liver and is excreted in the urine.

Glutathione adducts lose glutamate and glycine portions, and are acetylated to form mercapturic acids, which are excreted.

Levels of mercapturic in the urine may be used as an indicator of exposure to, e.g., ethylene dibromide, acrylamide, and terbuthylazine.

References

Liver anatomy